Dickkopf-related protein 1 is a protein that in humans is encoded by the DKK1 gene.

Function 

This gene encodes a protein that is a member of the dickkopf family. It is a secreted protein with two cysteine rich regions and is involved in embryonic development through its inhibition of the Wnt signaling pathway.  Dickkopf WNT signaling pathway inhibitor 1 (Dkk1) is a protein-coding gene that acts from the anterior visceral endoderm.  The dickkopf protein encoded by DKK1 is an antagonist of the Wnt/β-catenin signalling pathway that acts by isolating the LRP6 co-receptor so that it cannot aid in activating the WNT signaling pathway. DKK1 was also demonstrated to antagonize the Wnt/β-catenin pathway via a reduction in β-catenin and an increase in OCT4 expression.
This inhibition plays a key role in heart, head and forelimb development during anterior morphogenesis of the embryo.

Interactions 

DKK1 has been shown to interact with LRP6 and is a high affinity ligand of Kremen proteins.

Clinical significance 

Elevated levels of DKK1 in bone marrow, plasma and peripheral blood are associated with the presence of osteolytic bone lesions in patients with multiple myeloma. Due to the role of DKK1 in inflammation induced bone loss DKK1 is under investigation as target for therapeutic strategies in medicine and dentistry.

Animal studies 

Scientists have created a DKK1 knockout model in mice that revealed the effects of this gene.  All mice that were homozygous for the DKK1 knockout were dead at birth due to defects in the cranium and structures formed by the neural crest, such as failed development of eyes, olfactory placodes, frontonasal mass and mandibular processes, as well as incomplete development of the forebrain and midbrain and fusion of the digits of the forelimb. This evidence supports the idea that inhibition of the Wnt signaling pathway by DKK1 is crucial to proper cranial development.

In vitro studies

DKK1 is one of the most upregulated genes in androgen-potentiated balding, with DKK-1 messenger RNA upregulated a few hours after DHT treatment of hair follicles at the dermal papilla in vitro. Neutralizing antibody against DKK-1 reversed DHT effects on outer root sheath keratinocytes. DKK-1 expression is attenuated by L-threonate in vitro, with the latter a metabolite of ascorbate.

DKK1 and Alzheimer's

Alzheimer's disease occurs due to the overproduction of amyloid beta that will cluster together to form amyloid plaques between neurons in the brain and disrupt cell function. In addition, there is an accumulation of neurofibrillary tangles of hyperphosphorylated tau inside the neuron. The Wnt signaling pathway is crucial for brain development processes, which include neuron proliferation and differentiation as well as neuroblast migration and axon guidance.
Downregulation of this signaling has been shown in those with Alzheimer’s as a result of high levels of DKK1. Because of the hyperphosphorylation induced by DKK1, tau cannot interact with neuronal microtubules consequently compromising axonal transport resulting in synaptic loss and neuronal apoptosis. Because of its antagonistic effects on the Wnt signaling pathway, it is believed that DKK1 is a common marker for neuronal death in neurodegenerative diseases like Alzheimer’s.

References

Further reading